Robert Cleveland Log House is a historic home located at the Wilkes Heritage Museum in Wilkesboro, Wilkes County, North Carolina. It was originally located east of Purlear near junction of SR 1300 and 1317, and moved to its present location in 1986. It was built about 1780, and is a large two-pen log dwelling with exterior end stone chimneys and an uncoursed stone basement.  It was built by Revolutionary War veteran Captain Robert Cleveland, brother of Colonel Benjamin Cleveland, and is probably the oldest dwelling in Wilkes County.

It was listed on the National Register of Historic Places in 1972.

See also
 Robert Cleveland

References

External links
Wilkes Heritage Museum website

Log houses in the United States
Historic house museums in North Carolina
Houses on the National Register of Historic Places in North Carolina
Houses completed in 1780
Museums in Wilkes County, North Carolina
National Register of Historic Places in Wilkes County, North Carolina
Log buildings and structures on the National Register of Historic Places in North Carolina